Bogdanovskoye is a rural locality (a selo) in Nebylovskoye Rural Settlement, Yuryev-Polsky District, Vladimir Oblast, Russia. The population was 62 as of 2010.

Geography 
Bogdanovskoye is located 41 km east of Yuryev-Polsky (the district's administrative centre) by road. Dergayevo is the nearest rural locality.

References 

Rural localities in Yuryev-Polsky District